Nicolas Gistou sometimes Nicolas Gistow or Nicolò Gistou (d. 19 July 1609) was a Flemish counter-tenor musician and composer at the Danish court of Christian IV.  He was born in  Brussels and died in Copenhagen, aged about 50.

Works, editions and recordings
 Giardino novo belissimo, secondo libro, 1606
 Quel Augellin che canta (prima parte) / Ma ben arde nel core (seconda parte) - from Giardino novo belissimo, secondo libro, 1606. Consort of Musicke

References

Belgian composers
Male composers
Belgian male musicians
Countertenors
1609 deaths
Year of birth uncertain